The Imperials are an American Christian music group that has been active for over 55 years. Originating as a southern gospel quartet, the innovative group would become pioneers of contemporary Christian music in the 1960s. There have been many changes for the band in membership and musical styles over the years. They would go on to win four Grammys, 15 Dove Awards and be inducted into the Gospel Music Hall of Fame.

Group history

Jake Hess and the Imperials
The band had its genesis when long-time Statesmen Quartet member Jake Hess retired from that group on December 7, 1963. Hess wanted to start a new group recognized as "king" of the Southern gospel field and thought the "Imperials" would be a good moniker. After getting the go-ahead from Marion Snider for permission to use the name (Snider had previously operated an Imperial Quartet named after its sponsor Imperial Sugar), he gathered together pianist Henry Slaughter from the Weatherford Quartet, ex-Oak Ridge Boys baritone Gary McSpadden, the Weatherford Quartet's bass singer Armond Morales and Speer Family tenor Sherrill (Shaun) Neilsen to join him. After signing with Benson Records in 1964, the group recorded their first of many albums on the Heart Warming Records label. The following year, the quartet organization moved from Atlanta to Nashville, Tennessee. After two years with the group, tenor Nielsen was first to go and Jim Murray would replace him. Murray's past included stints with The Melodares, the Stamps Trio, Inspirationals, and Orrell Quartet.  About this time, Slaughter also departed with Joe Moscheo of the Harmoneers replacing him at the keyboard.

The Elvis years
In late 1966, Henry Slaughter left the group and Hess assembled a new, more contemporary band to accompany the quartet. Joe Moscheo on piano, Larry Benson on drums, keyboard bass and miscellaneous other instruments along with Dave Mathis on electric guitar formed this new sound behind the group. Ron Hamm replaced Mathis on guitar within a few months. In late mid 1967, Hess began having heart issues and by the end of the year left the road, under doctor's orders, turning the reins of the group over to Morales, Moscheo and Murray. McSpadden chose to leave around this time in 1967 also. With new members Roger Wiles (from family group the Melodaires) and former Stamps Quartet member, Terry Blackwood, the group became known as The Imperials (rather than "Jake Hess and the Imperials") and adopted a more contemporary sound on the 1967 album New Dimensions. It also brought them their first of many awards: "Male Quartet of the Year" in 1969 from the Gospel Music Association.

Elvis Presley had long harbored a love for gospel and Jake Hess in particular. The group recorded with Elvis in sessions from May 1966 to June 1971. This included his last two Grammy Award-producing albums: How Great Thou Art (which won a Grammy for the title song and featured a duet with Hess on the classic Statesmen song "If the Lord Wasn't Walking by My Side") and He Touched Me (which used many of the songs that The Imperials had recorded on their own albums and, again, won a Grammy for the title song). In 1969, Elvis hired the group to perform in concert with him after the Jordanaires had turned down Elvis' invitation to play Las Vegas and tour because, as studio singers, they did not feel they could afford to be away from Nashville that much. At the same time the Imperials appeared with Jimmy Dean, live and on his television show. Larry Gatlin auditioned for the group in the fall of 1970, then got the call to sing with them in early 1971 backing Jimmy Dean in Las Vegas. However, his tenure with the group would last for less than a month. With the help of Dottie West, he and his wife moved to Nashville to begin a career in country music. He was replaced by Greg Gordon. In November 1971, because of scheduling conflicts, they decided to stop performing with Elvis. The following year the group quit performing in concert with Jimmy Dean.

From pioneers to headliners in CCM

The Imperials surprised gospel music fans in February 1972 by hiring Sherman Andrus, a former member of Andrae Crouch and the Disciples to replace Greg Gordon. This made them the first interracial Christian group America had ever seen, which Andrus jokingly referred as: "to boldly go where no black man had gone before". The lineup of the group stayed stable with Andrus and Terry Blackwood sharing lead vocals through 1976 when Joe Moscheo left just after recording of Follow the Man with the Music. The following year, the pair themselves left to form contemporary Christian music act Andrus, Blackwood & Company.

In early 1976, the group hired baritone David Will, (who sang lead for the Keystone Quartet and the Statesmen, and would stay on for 23 years with the Imperials) and soulful belter Russ Taff as their new lead vocalist. The Taff-led outfit is heard on the albums Sail On, Imperials Live, Heed the Call, One More Song for You, Christmas with The Imperials, and Priority. It was during this era that the group found their biggest success, both with awards and on the charts. Also in this group were Jim Murray and Armond Morales.

After Taff
After five years with the group, Taff left for a solo career. Paul Smith, who while promoting an Imperials concert at Baylor University (while he was a student there), gave Armond Morales a tape of his music. When Morales knew that Taff was leaving, he called Smith. Paul is first heard on 1982's Stand by the Power. During Smith's time with the group came another first, a 2-disc album with each member taking a solo side (Side by Side), which gave them their last Dove Award. Then a return to four-part harmony singing (The Imperials Sing the Classics) before returning to their Christian pop sound on 1985's Let the Wind Blow.

The group saw its biggest turnover since Blackwood and Andrus' departure when both Smith and long-time tenor Jim Murray left the group. Smith opted for a solo CCM career while Murray sought to perform more traditionally styled gospel music again. Smith was replaced by Danny Ward, but he left before recording an album with the band. In the end, Jimmie Lee Sloas and Ron Hemby were the new members bringing an infusion of youth into the group. Hemby was later a member of the country band The Buffalo Club.

The Imperials stirred up controversy and lost some of their long-time fans when they exchanged their usually soft pop-rock sound for a more rock sound with prominent electric guitars for the 1987 album This Year's Model. The song "Power of God" became a theme song for Christian bodybuilders The Power Team and new younger fans began to come to Imperials concerts. The album Free the Fire reverted a bit towards the soft pop sound and after its recording Sloas became the next Imperial to seek a solo career. David Robertson replaced him but following 1990's Love's Still Changing Hearts he himself opted to go solo with Jason Beddoe and Jonathan Hildreth (later known as Jonathan Pierce) joining the ranks. As the story goes, Naomi Judd heard Jonathan sing a solo while he was a member of the Christ Church Choir in Nashville. She then told a member of The Imperials.

In 1991, The Imperials would surprise fans again by bringing in Armond's sister Pam Morales to the line up. Although she appeared with The Imperials in the early 80s as a backup singer, this would be the first time a female was a front member of the quartet. Longtime member Armond Morales decided to bring her in when Beddoe left the group while in the midst of recording for Big God. She remained in the lineup through 1993's Stir It Up.

A new focus on ministry
1993 saw the group change and go in a different direction. What once was strictly a set contract agreement to most performances, the Imperials began to re-establish themselves by scaling down their act, opting for simple accompaniment and more intimate church performances in lieu of stadium and large concerts—ministering in local churches for free-will offerings only. The Imperials that year performed in over 200 churches, more dates than the previous two years, this they achieved with Brian Comeaux singing lead and a succession of tenors, including Mark Addock, Peter Pankratz and Bill Morris, singing at selected dates. No albums were recorded during this time.

In 1994, they returned with new members Steven Ferguson and Jeff Walker, both of whom were ordained ministers—as were Armond and Will by this time. They signed a one-project deal with the familiar Impact Records, which had just been re-acquired by Homeland Records and Landmark Distribution. After a three-year recording hiatus, the release of Til He Comes marked the change back to a four-part harmony sound—losing the hard edge of previous albums and helping restore their original fans to the fold.

In 1998, The Imperials were inducted into the Gospel Music Association's Gospel Music Hall of Fame. All five original members, Hess, Morales, McSpadden, Sherrill, and Slaughter; as well as Blackwood, Andrus, Moscheo, Murray, and Taff were there to accept the induction.

In 2003, the five members of The Imperials that toured with Elvis (Murray, Blackwood, Wiles, Morales and Moscheo) reunited for a 25th Anniversary, Elvis Lives concert and DVD recording, in Memphis, Tennessee.

The next generation
In September 2004, Armond Morales transferred ownership of The Imperials to the lineup at the time: son Jason Morales, Jeremie Hudson, Ian Owens and Shannon Smith. This version of the group released two albums on Lamon Records, The Imperials (2006) and Back to the Roots (2007), which is a collection of new versions of classic Imperials songs, and brought the group's first top 20 song in more than 15 years. The Hudson-Smith-Morales-Owens lineup of the group also performed at Carnegie Hall (the first time the Imperials ever appeared at that venue).

In 2008, the Imperials were inducted into the Christian Music Hall of Fame. Taff was inducted for his contributions separately but performed with the Imperials and made the acceptance with them for the broadcast. In April 2008, The Imperials received the Southern Gospel News Awards' Album of the Year award for Back to the Roots. In early 2010, the Imperials, consisting of Jason Morales, Ian Owens, Scott Allen, and Perry Jones, disbanded.

Classics return as The Imperials
Returning from a restless retirement and a short-lived legal scrimmage for control of the "Imperials" name, Armond Morales, along with Imperials alumni Smith and Will, joined Robbie Hiner and Rick Evans – the group's GM and lead singer – to continue the legacy of The Imperials. Morales – the only still-performing original member – along with the rest of the reunited foursome, released Still Standing in 2010, their first project with Smith in 25 years.

Accomplishments
 First Dove Award winner for male group of the year (1969)
 First gospel group to perform live on The Grammy Awards.
 First Dove Award winner for Artist of the Year (1981)
 First group to have a No. 1 song ("Oh Buddha") on all three of the following charts: Contemporary, Inspirational, Southern Gospel
 First Christian group to use four individual microphones on stage
 First Christian group to use cordless microphones
 First Christian group to use a live band on stage
 Recorded the theme song for the Daniel Boone television series
 Only Christian group to have a No. 1 song charting in four consecutive decades (1960s–1990s)

Discography

Members

In memoriam
 Jake Hess: December 24, 1927 – January 4, 2004
 Pam Morales-Dietz: (d) August 27, 2005
 Sherrill "Shaun" Nielsen: September 10, 1942 – December 10, 2010
 Joe Moscheo: August 11, 1937 – January 11, 2016
 Gary McSpadden: January 26, 1943 – April 15, 2020
 Jonathan Pierce Hildreth: October 15, 1967 – May 9, 2020
 Henry Slaughter: January 9, 1927 – November 13, 2020
 David Will: October 22, 1943 – March 4, 2022
 Armond Morales: February 25, 1932 – December 5, 2022

Accolades

References

External links
 
 
 Rick Evans

American Christian musical groups
Gospel quartets
Grammy Award winners
Musical groups established in 1964
Elvis Presley